Cabal is a political party in Guatemala lead by Edmond Mulet. In English, the party's name can be translated literally as "thorough", or colloquially as "exact" or "spot on".

History
The Humanist Party of Guatemala was founded by Edmond Mulet in 2017, and became his political platform to run for the 2019 presidential election. Mulet, favored by his international experience, came in third place. The Humanist Party won six seats in Congress.

In January 2020, the Humanist Party declared itself "in opposition" to the government of Alejandro Giammattei, but within a few months the party became part of the ruling coalition. Mulet denounced the act and resigned his membership of the party.

In November 2020, Mulet announced his new political platform "Cabal". In July 2022, the party was registered by the Supreme Electoral Tribunal.

In 2022, the party announced that Mulet would run for president again in 2023, with Máximo Santa Cruz being selected as the vice-presidential candidate.

Election results

President of the Republic of Guatemala

Congress of the Republic

References

External links

2020 establishments in Guatemala
Political parties established in 2020
Political parties in Guatemala